Pape Mamadou Diouf (born 31 December 1982) is a Senegalese former professional footballer who played as a goalkeeper.

External links
 
 
 

1982 births
Living people
Senegalese footballers
Serer sportspeople
Association football goalkeepers
Senegal international footballers
Championnat National players
ASC Jeanne d'Arc players
FC Montceau Bourgogne players
SC Toulon players
FC Vesoul players
Senegalese expatriate footballers
Senegalese expatriate sportspeople in France
Expatriate footballers in France